Labeobarbus dartevellei is a species of cyprinid fish in the genus Labeobarbus which has not been recorded since the type specimen was collected in the Democratic Republic of the Congo.

References

dartevellei
Taxa named by Max Poll
Fish described in 1945
Cyprinid fish of Africa
Endemic fauna of the Democratic Republic of the Congo